Western Tablet and Stationery Company, Building #2, also known as WESTAB Building #2 and Meade Corp. Building #2, is a historic industrial building located at St. Joseph, Missouri.  The original section was built in 1920, with an "L"-shaped addition built in 1941.  It is a six-story, reinforced concrete frame and brick masonry building on a raised basement.  It was designed with Prairie School style-derived influence. The St. Joseph facility was closed in 2004.

It was listed on the National Register of Historic Places in 2007.

References

Industrial buildings and structures on the National Register of Historic Places in Missouri
Prairie School architecture in Missouri
Industrial buildings completed in 1920
Buildings and structures in St. Joseph, Missouri
National Register of Historic Places in Buchanan County, Missouri
Office supply companies of the United States